Puck is an American digital media company that covers the  four centers of power in the United States: Silicon Valley, Hollywood, Washington and Wall Street. It was founded by Joe Purzycki, Jon Kelly, Liz Gough, Julia Ioffe, and Max Tcheyan. In 2021, the company received $7 million in funding from Standard Industries and TPG Growth.

References

External links
Official website

Digital media organizations
Companies established in 2021
Internet properties established in 2021